Royal Prussian Jagdstaffel 53, commonly abbreviated to Jasta 53, was a "hunting group" (i.e., fighter squadron) of the Luftstreitkräfte, the air arm of the Imperial German Army during World War I. The squadron would score over 20 aerial victories during the war. The unit's victories came at the expense of one pilot killed in a flying accident, another injured in an accident, one wounded in action, and four taken prisoner of war.

History
Jasta 53 was founded on 27 December 1917 at Flieger-Abteilung (Flier Detachment) 9, Darmstadt, Germany. It began operations on 9 January 1918. However, the new squadron did not fly its first combat missions until 10 March 1918. On 22 March 1918, they scored their first three aerial victories.

Commanding officers (Staffelführer)
 Theodor Quandt: 27 December 1917 – 23 August 1918
 Robert Hildebrand: 23 August 1918

Duty stations
 Attigny, France: 10 January 1918
 Mont-d'Origny: 18 March 1918
 Flavy-le-Martel, France
 Moyencourt, France
 Mars-sous-Bourcq, France: 15 July 1918
 Chuffilly-Roche, France
 Malmy
 Antrecourt

Aircraft
 Albatros D.Vas
 Pfalz D.III
 Some Pfalz D.XIIs
 Fokker Dr.I triplanes
 Fokker D.VIIs

Operations
On 10 January 1918, Jasta 53 was posted to 3 Armee. On 18 March, it was transferred to 18 Armee. On 15 July 1918, Jasta 53 returned to 3 Armee control. It joined Jagdgruppe 11 at this time; JG 11 moved to support 9 Armee a few days later. On 25 September 1918, Jasta 53 returned to support of 3 Armee until war's end.

References

Bibliography
 

53
Military units and formations established in 1917
1917 establishments in Germany
Military units and formations disestablished in 1918